Robert Levy or Robert Lévy was a French Jewish physician who served with the German army in World War I, for two years. During World War II, he served as the prisoner-doctor at Auschwitz.

Levy was arrested on May 12, 1943, in Limoges and deported from Drancy on September 2, 1943, then deported to Auschwitz in 1944 and belonged to the concentration camp personnel conducting medical treatments at the Auschwitz II Birkenau death factory. He worked in the surgical block where the records were also kept. In his notes presented at the Nuremberg Trials (SS im Einsatz, 167/2), Lévy mentioned "losing" 96% of his patients on several occasions. Every now and then, new selections among prisoners made to strip naked, were arranged on the block by head-doctor Friedrich Entress (see Mauthausen-Gusen camp trials). The injured – who were unable to return to work considerably quickly – were sent right away for the so-called "special handling" (Sonderbehandlung) at Block 20, which meant one thing: the phenol injection.

Notes and references
Notes

Bibliography
 

Auschwitz concentration camp survivors
20th-century French Jews
People from Limoges
20th-century French physicians